Cockney Rejects are an English punk rock band that formed in the East End of London in 1978. Their 1980 song "Oi, Oi, Oi" was the inspiration for the name of the Oi! music genre. The band members are supporters of West Ham United, and pay tribute to the club with their hit cover version of "I'm Forever Blowing Bubbles", a song traditionally sung by West Ham supporters.

Career
Cockney Rejects were formed in 1978 by brothers Jeff and Micky Geggus, with their brother-in-law Chris Murrell on bass and Paul Harvey on drums.  Their first demo, "Flares n' Slippers", caught the attention of Small Wonder Records owner Pete Stennett, who introduced the band to Bob Sergeant. With Sergeant, they recorded their single "Flares n' Slippers", which sold out its first pressing. Murrell and Harvey were then replaced by Vince Riordan on bass and Andy Scott on drums, from fellow East End London band, The Tickets.  This became known as Cockney Rejects' classic lineup, and its debut at the Bridge House in Canning Town in June 1979 is considered a turning point for the band. In September of that same year, the band signed with EMI and released their album Greatest Hits, Vol. 1 in February 1980.<

Their biggest hit single in the United Kingdom, 1980's "The Greatest Cockney Rip-Off", was a parody of Sham 69's song "Hersham Boys". Other Cockney Rejects songs were less commercial, partly because they tended to be about hard-edged topics such as street fighting or football hooliganism. Other singles to appear in the UK were "Bad Man," "We Can Do Anything," "I'm Forever Blowing Bubbles " and "We Are the Firm" — all from 1980.

The violence depicted in their lyrics was often mirrored at their concerts, and the band members often fought to defend themselves (often from supporters of opposing football teams) or to split up conflicts between audience members. Jeff and Mick Geggus had both been amateur youth boxers, and had fought at the national level. Bass player Vince Riordan's uncle was Jack "The Hat" McVitie, a Cockney gangster who was murdered by Reggie Kray.

Cockney Rejects expressed contempt for all politicians in their lyrics, and they rejected media claims that they had a British Movement following, or that the band members supported the views of that far right group. In their first Sounds interview, they mockingly referred to the British Movement as the "German Movement" and stated that many of their heroes were black boxers. Jeff Turner's autobiography Cockney Reject describes an incident in which the band members and their supporters had a massive fight against British Movement members at one of Cockney Rejects' early concerts.

EMI records released a definitive Rejects retrospective on 29 August 2011. Called Join the Rejects, the Zonophone years '79-'81, it was a three-disc collection of all their EMI recordings including all the Peel sessions and rare demos from the day. Also included was a colour booklet with a blow-by-blow account of the stories behind the music by Micky Geggus.

The Rejects movie East End Babylon and an album of the same name were released in 2013.
 
Tony Van Frater died in October 2015 from a heart attack at the age of 51.

In February 2016, it was announced that former Cockney Reject bass player Vince Riordan had re-joined the band again.

The group were slated to perform their first Australian shows in February 2019, however a family emergency necessitated the postponement of the concerts to July. The concerts were later rescheduled to October and went ahead that month to critical acclaim.

Members

Current members
 Jeff Geggus (Stinky Turner) – vocals (1978–present)
 Mick Geggus – guitar (1978–present)
 Vince Riordan – bass (1979–1983, 1987–1991, 2015–present)
 Joe Perry Sansome – drums (2017–present)

Former members
 Chris Murrell – bass (1978–1979)
 Paul Harvey – drums (1978–1979)
 Andy Scott – drums (1979–1980)
 Nigel Woof – drums (1980)
 Keith Warrington – drums (1980–1985, 1987–1991)
 Ian Campbell – bass (1983–1985)
 Tony Van Frater – bass (1999–2015; died 2015)
 Andrew Laing – drums (1999–2000, 2007–2017)
 Les Cobb – drums (2000–2007)

Timeline

Discography

Albums
 Greatest Hits Vol. 1 (EMI, 1980)
 Greatest Hits Vol. II (EMI, 1980)
 The Power and the Glory (EMI, 1981)
 The Wild Ones (A.K.A. Records, 1982)
 Quiet Storm (Heavy Metal Records, 1984)
 Lethal (Neat Records, 1990)
 Out of the Gutter (Captain Oi Records, 2002)
 Unforgiven (G&R Records, 2007)
 East End Babylon  (Cadiz Music, 2012)
 Power Grab  (Cadiz Music, 2022)

EPs and singles
 "Flares & Slippers" (7-inch, EP) (Small Wonder, 1979)
 "I'm Not a Fool" (7-inch single) (EMI, 1979) UK No. 65
 "Bad Man" (7-inch) (EMI, 1980) UK No. 65
 "The Greatest Cockney Rip Off" (7-inch. Limited Edition in Yellow Vinyl) (EMI/Zonophone, 1980) UK No. 21
 "I'm Forever Blowing Bubbles" (7-inch) (EMI/Zonophone, 1980) UK No. 35
 "We Can Do Anything" (7-inch) (EMI/Zonophone, 1980) UK No. 65
 "We Are the Firm" (7-inch) (EMI/Zonophone, 1980) UK No. 54
 "Easy Life" (7-inch, Live EP) (EMI/Zonophone, 1981)
 "On the Streets Again" (7-inch) (EMI/Zonophone, 1981)
 "Till the End of the Day" (7-inch) (AKA 1982)
 "Back to the Start" (7-inch) (Heavy Metal Records, 1984)
 "It's Gonna Kick Off!" (7-inch, EP) (Cadiz Music, 2016)
 "Goodbye Upton Park" (7-inch) (Cadiz Music,2016)

Compilation and live albums
 Greatest Hits Vol. 3 (Live & Loud) (1981)
 Unheard Rejects (1985 - collection of demo tracks recorded between 1979 and 1981)
 We Are The Firm (1986)
 The Best Of The Cockney Rejects (1993)
 The Punk Singles Collection (Dojo, 1997)
 Oi! Oi! Oi! (Castle, 1997)
 Greatest Hits Volume 4: Here They Come Again (Rhythm Vicar, 2000 - reissued as Back on the Street - Victory Records, 2000)
 Join the Rejects, the Zonophone years '79-'81 (EMI)

Appearances
 Oi! The Album (1980)
 Total Noise (7-inch EP - 1983 - as Dead Generation)
 Lords Of Oi! (Dressed to Kill, 1997)
 Addicted to Oi! (2001)

References

External links

Official website

Street punk groups
Musical groups established in 1979
Oi! groups
English punk rock groups
EMI Records artists
Musical groups from London
Association football supporters